Ian Vaughan may refer to:

Ian Vaughan, Canadian politician
Ian Vaughan (footballer), English former footballer who played for Rotherham United and Stockport County